François Schommer (20 November 1850, Paris29 October 1935, Neuilly-sur-Seine) was a French painter, watercolorist and decorative artist.

Biography 
His first exhibit at the Salon came in 1870, and he would continue to exhibit there until his death. He also had showings with the Société des Artistes Français.

In 1878, he was awarded first place in the Prix de Rome for his work "César-Auguste au tombeau d'Alexandre". Later, he received silver medals at the Exposition Universelle (1889) and the Exposition Universelle (1900).

In 1910, he was named a Professor at the École des Beaux-Arts and also served on the faculty at the Académie Julian. He became a member of the Institut de France in 1924.

He was named a Knight in the Legion of Honor in 1890, and was later promoted to Officer. He is interred at the Cimetière du Père-Lachaise.

His works may be seen at the Musée de l'Armée and the Musée d'Orsay.

References

External links 

1850 births
1935 deaths
19th-century French painters
French watercolourists
French portrait painters
French history painters
Académie Julian
École des Beaux-Arts
Painters from Paris
20th-century French painters